Pearl is a 2020 American drama film directed by Bobby Roth, starring Anthony LaPaglia, Larsen Thompson and Sarah Carter.

Cast
 Anthony LaPaglia as Jack Wolf
 Larsen Thompson as Pearl
 Sarah Carter as Helen
 Barbara Williams as Eve
 Néstor Carbonell as Anthony
 J. August Richards as Isaac Robbins
 Melissa Macedo as Silvia
 Nighttrain Schickele as Zack
 Bruce Davison as The Dean
 Reed Diamond as Marty Siegel

Release
The film was released on 11 August 2020.

Reception
Frank Schenk of The Hollywood Reporter wrote that Roth "delivers a familiar-feeling but affecting tale about a middle-aged man who finds emotional redemption when he’s suddenly tasked with parental responsibilities he never imagined he’d have." Bradley Gibson of Film Threat gave the film a score of 8/10 and wrote, "The film explores dark territory but treats the subjects with emotional intelligence and sensitivity. Whether or not Jack and Pearl come to mean anything to each other, the journey they take toward becoming “father and daughter” is enlightening."

Joe Leydon of Variety wrote, "Wildly uneven but sporadically affecting, Bobby Roth’s Pearl is a curiously disjointed drama that relies on the compelling performances of veteran actor Anthony LaPaglia and promising newcomer Larsen Thompson for most of its emotional impact."

References

External links
 
 

American drama films
2020 drama films